Logan Square is a subway station on the Chicago Transit Authority's 'L' system, serving the Blue Line and the Logan Square neighborhood. It was the terminus of the Milwaukee Elevated until it was extended to Jefferson Park in 1970 and to O'Hare Airport in 1984 via the Kennedy Expressway. From Logan Square, trains run at intervals of 2–7 minutes during rush-hour periods, and take 14 minutes to travel to the Loop. O'Hare bound trains take 26 minutes to reach the airport.

History

The current subway station replaced an older elevated station that opened in 1895 as part of the Metropolitan West Side Elevated line. The older Logan Square station was the terminal of the West-Northwest Route (the predecessor to the Blue Line) until 1970 when the line was extended via the Kennedy Expressway to Jefferson Park and eventually to O'Hare in September 1984.

Station Layout
Logan Square features a mezzanine with faregates at each end of the platform, one at Kedzie Avenue at the southeast end of the platform and the other at Spaulding Avenue at the northeast end. The Kedzie Avenue mezzanine is fully staffed, has farecard vending machines, has two entrances: a larger one on the north side of the intersection of Kedzie and Milwaukee Avenues with a bus stop and elevator, and a smaller one on the south side of that intersection. The Spaulding Avenue mezzanine is usually unstaffed and does not have farecard vending machines, and has an entrance on either side of Milwaukee Avenue. The platform itself is significantly longer than the length of a train, with trains stopping at the southeast end of the platform closest to the Kedzie Avenue entrance, leaving a significant portion of the platform at the northwest end that is not directly served by trains.

The layout of the station is similar to Belmont, the next station to the northwest, but unlike Belmont, Logan Square has a mezzanine at each end of the platform, while Belmont only has a single entrance and single mezzanine. Logan Square also has an elevator at the Kedzie entrance, while Belmont does not have any elevators.

Bus connections
CTA
  56 Milwaukee 
  76 Diversey

References

External links 
Logan Square Station Page
Kedzie Avenue Bus Terminal entrance from Google Maps Street View
Kedzie Avenue entrance from Google Maps Street View
Spaulding Avenue entrance from Google Maps Street View

CTA Blue Line stations
Railway stations in the United States opened in 1970
1970 establishments in Illinois